Alya may refer to:

 Alya (name), a female name

 Alya, the IAU-approved proper name of the primary component of the triple star system Theta Serpentis

 Alya Manasa (born 1992), Indian television actress
 Alya (singer) (born 1983), Slovenian pop singer
 `Alya', a village in Saudi Arabia

See also 
 Alia (disambiguation)
 Aliya (disambiguation)
 Aliyah (disambiguation)
 Aaliyah (1979–2001), American R&B singer